Hogan are a four-piece pop rock band from Offaly, Ireland consisting of Mark Hogan (vocals, guitar), Wayne Brereton (guitar) and Ronan Nolan (drums).

History
Their debut album Boom! was released in 2010.

Band members
 Mark Hogan – Lead vocals, Rhythm guitar
 Wayne Brereton – Lead guitar, Backing vocalist
 Ronan Nolan – Drums, Percussion

Former members
 Jonathan Westman – Bass

Discography

Studio albums

EPs

Singles

Band nominations
 Hogan has been nominated for MTV Music Award Newcomer (IR) 2010

References

External links
 Official website

Musical groups established in 2006
Irish rock music groups
Musical groups from County Offaly